is a Japanese judoka.

She started taking part in karate at the age of 7 and she became national junior karate champion when she was 10, but at age 13, she quit karate and started to practise judo.

She won the bronze medal in the half-heavyweight (78 kg) division at the 2010 World Judo Championships, and silver a year later.  She has also won silver at the Asian Games.  She had previously won the junior world title in that weight division.

Her favorite techniques are uchimata, ōuchi gari and sankaku-jime.

She currently competes in the Japanese MMA league Shooto, and works as a Judo therapist.

References

External links
 
 
 

1990 births
Living people
Japanese female judoka
Asian Games medalists in judo
Judoka at the 2012 Summer Olympics
Olympic judoka of Japan
Judoka at the 2010 Asian Games
Asian Games silver medalists for Japan
Medalists at the 2010 Asian Games
21st-century Japanese women